HSC T&T Spirit is a fast ferry operated by the government of Trinidad and Tobago.

Launched in 2002, she was initially built as a civilian ferry, but was converted for military use in the final stages of construction. She served from 2002 to 2005 with the United States Army's Tank-Automotive and Armaments Command (TACOM) as the first Theater Support Vessel (TSV). During this period she was designated . Following military service, she was converted for civilian passenger and vehicle ferry service with the Trinidad and Tobago government on the Port of Spain – Scarborough route along with the T&T Express

USAV Spearhead (TSV-1X)

As USAV Spearhead (TSV-1X), the ship was the first of the US Army's theater support vessel (TSV) program. The Army leased Spearhead from Australian fast ferry builder Incat in October 2002. Modifications included helicopter pads suitable for large military helicopters and a two-part hydraulic vehicle ramp that allows rapid loading and discharge of vehicles from the stern or alongside. With its 1,250-ton capacity and shallow draft, Spearhead was the first of what was expected to become a fleet of as many as 17 TSVs.

Spearhead was deployed in January 2003 to support Operation Enduring Freedom and Operation Iraqi Freedom.

The vessel was withdrawn from US Army service in 2005, moving to civilian service as HSC T&T Spirit.

Sister ships

References

Ferries of Trinidad and Tobago
2002 ships
Incat high-speed craft
Ships built by Incat